
Gmina Domaradz is a rural gmina (administrative district) in Brzozów County, Subcarpathian Voivodeship, in south-eastern Poland.

Villages
The gmina contains the villages of Domaradz, Barycz and Golcowa.

Neighbouring gminas
Gmina Domaradz is bordered by the gminas of Błażowa, Brzozów, Jasienica Rosielna, Niebylec and Nozdrzec.

References
Polish official population figures 2006

Domaradz
Brzozów County